The Users’ Guides to the Medical Literature is a series of articles originally published in the Journal of the American Medical Association, later rewritten and compiled in a textbook, now in its third edition.  The guides provide practical, clinician-friendly advice on all aspects of evidence-based medicine.

As articles

During the late 1970s a group of clinical epidemiologists at McMaster University including Dr. David Sackett prepared a series of articles to assist clinicians interpreting clinical research.  These articles, introducing the term "critical appraisal", appeared in the Canadian Medical Association Journal beginning in 1981.

In 1990 Dr. Gordon Guyatt introduced the term "evidence-based medicine" to stress the role of rigorous, systematic evidence from clinical research in conjunction with patients’ values and preferences in clinical decision-making.  A group of academic physicians subsequently formed the international Evidence-based Medicine Working Group and published a 1992 article announcing the "new paradigm" of evidence-based medicine.

The Evidence-based Medicine Working Group decided to build on the popular series in the Canadian Medical Association Journal by creating a more practical approach to applying the medical literature to clinical practice.  Championed by Dr. Drummond Rennie, an editor of the Journal of the American Medical Association, the result was the Users' Guides.  The guides originally consisted of 25 topics, covered in a series of 32 articles published in the Journal of the American Medical Association between 1993 and 2000, describing approaches to different types of medical questions and the study designs that may answer them.

The complete list is as follows:

Barratt, A. et al., 1999. Users’ Guides to the Medical Literature: XVII. How to Use Guidelines and Recommendations About Screening. JAMA, 281(21), pp. 2029–2034. Available at: http://jama.ama-assn.org/cgi/doi/10.1001/jama.281.21.2029

Bucher, H.C. et al., 1999. Users’ Guides to the Medical Literature: XIX. Applying Clinical Trial Results; A. How to Use an Article Measuring the Effect of an Intervention on Surrogate End Points. JAMA, 282(8), pp. 771–778. Available at: http://jama.ama-assn.org/cgi/doi/10.1001/jama.282.8.771.

Dans, A.L. et al., 1998. Users’ Guides to the Medical Literature: XIV. How to Decide on the Applicability of Clinical Trial Results to Your Patient. JAMA, 279(7), pp. 545–549. Available at: http://jama.ama-assn.org/cgi/doi/10.1001/jama.279.7.545

Drummond, M.F. et al., 1997. Users’ guides to the medical literature. XIII. How to use an article on economic analysis of clinical practice. A. Are the results of the study valid? Evidence-Based Medicine Working Group. JAMA, 277(19), pp. 1552–1557. Available at: http://jama.ama-assn.org.

GH, G. et al., 1995. Users’ guides to the medical literature, IX: a method for grading health care recommendations. JAMA, 274, pp. 1800–1804.

Giacomini, M.K. & Cook, D.J., 2000. Users’ Guides to the Medical Literature: XXIII. Qualitative Research in Health Care A. Are the Results of the Study Valid? JAMA, 284(3), pp. 357–362. Available at: http://jama.ama-assn.org/cgi/doi/10.1001/jama.284.3.357

Giacomini, M.K. & Cook, D.J., 2000. Users’ Guides to the Medical Literature: XXIII. Qualitative Research in Health Care B. What Are the Results and How Do They Help Me Care for My Patients? JAMA, 284(4), pp. 478–482. Available at: http://jama.ama-assn.org/cgi/doi/10.1001/jama.284.4.478.

Guyatt, G., Sackett, D. & Cook, D., 1993. Users’ guides to the medical literature, II: how to use an article about therapy or prevention, A: are the results of the study valid? JAMA, 270, pp. 2598–2601.

Guyatt, G., Sackett, D. & Cook, D., 1994. Users’ guides to the medical literature, II: how to use an article about therapy or prevention, B: what were the results and will they help me in caring for my patients? JAMA, 271, pp. 59–63.

Guyatt, G.H. & Rennie, D., 1993. Users’ guides to the medical literature. JAMA, 270(17), pp. 2096–2097. Available at: http://jama.ama-assn.org.

Guyatt, G.H. et al., 2000. Users’ Guides to the Medical Literature: XXV. Evidence-Based Medicine: Principles for Applying the Users' Guides to Patient Care. JAMA, 284(10), pp. 1290–1296. Available at: http://jama.ama-assn.org/cgi/doi/10.1001/jama.284.10.1290.

Guyatt, G.H. et al., 1997. Users’ guides to the medical literature. XII. How to use articles about health-related quality of life. Evidence-Based Medicine Working Group. JAMA, 277(15), pp. 1232–1237. Available at: http://jama.ama-assn.org.
Guyatt, G.H. et al., 1999. Users’ Guides to the Medical Literature: XVI. How to Use a Treatment Recommendation. JAMA, 281(19), pp. 1836–1843. Available at: http://jama.ama-assn.org/cgi/doi/10.1001/jama.281.19.1836

Hayward, R.S. et al., 1995. Users’ guides to the medical literature. VIII. How to use clinical practice guidelines. A. Are the recommendations valid? The Evidence-Based Medicine Working Group. JAMA, 274(7), pp. 570–574. Available at: http://jama.ama-assn.org.

Hunt, D.L., Jaeschke, R.Z. & McKibbon, K.A., 2000. Users’ Guides to the Medical Literature: XXI. Using Electronic Health Information Resources in Evidence-Based Practice. JAMA, 283(14), pp. 1875–1879. Available at: http://jama.ama-assn.org/cgi/doi/10.1001/jama.283.14.1875

Jaeschke, R.Z., Guyatt, G.H. & Sackett, D.L., 1994. Users’ guides to the medical literature. III. How to use an article about a diagnostic test. A. Are the results of the study valid? Evidence-Based Medicine Working Group. JAMA, 271(5), pp. 389–391. Available at: http://jama.ama-assn.org.

Jaeschke, R.Z., Guyatt, G.H. & Sackett, D.L., 1994. Users’ guides to the medical literature. III. How to use an article about a diagnostic test. B. What are the results and will they help me in caring for my patients? The Evidence-Based Medicine Working Group. JAMA, 271(9), pp. 703–707. Available at: http://jama.ama-assn.org.

Laupacis, A et al., 1994. Users’ guides to the medical literature. V. How to use an article about prognosis. Evidence-Based Medicine Working Group. JAMA, 272(3), pp. 234–237. Available at: http://jama.ama-assn.org.

Levine, M. et al., 1994. Users’ guides to the medical literature. IV. How to use an article about harm. Evidence-Based Medicine Working Group. JAMA, 271(20), pp. 1615–1619. Available at: http://jama.ama-assn.org.

McAlister, F.A. et al., 1999. Users’ Guides to the Medical Literature: XIX. Applying Clinical Trial Results; B. Guidelines for Determining Whether a Drug Is Exerting (More Than) a Class Effect. JAMA, 282(14), pp. 1371–1377. Available at: http://jama.ama-assn.org/cgi/doi/10.1001/jama.282.14.1371

McAlister, F.A. et al., 2000. Users’ Guides to the Medical Literature: XX. Integrating Research Evidence With the Care of the Individual Patient. JAMA, 283(21), pp. 2829–2836. Available at: http://jama.ama-assn.org/cgi/doi/10.1001/jama.283.21.2829

McGinn, T.G. et al., 2000. Users’ Guides to the Medical Literature: XXII: How to Use Articles About Clinical Decision Rules. JAMA, 284(1), pp. 79–84. Available at: http://jama.ama-assn.org/cgi/doi/10.1001/jama.284.1.79

Naylor, C.D. & Guyatt, G.H., 1996. Users’ guides to the medical literature. X. How to use an article reporting variations in the outcomes of health services. The Evidence-Based Medicine Working Group. JAMA, 275(7), pp. 554–558. Available at: http://jama.ama-assn.org.

Naylor, C.D. & Guyatt, G.H., 1996. Users’ guides to the medical literature. XI. How to use an article about a clinical utilization review. Evidence-Based Medicine Working Group. JAMA, 275(18), pp. 1435–1439. Available at: http://jama.ama-assn.org.

Oxman, A.D., Cook, D.J. & Guyatt, G.H., 1994. Users’ guides to the medical literature. VI. How to use an overview. Evidence-Based Medicine Working Group. JAMA, 272(17), pp. 1367–1371. Available at: http://jama.ama-assn.org.

O’Brien, B.J. et al., 1997. Users’ guides to the medical literature. XIII. How to use an article on economic analysis of clinical practice. B. What are the results and will they help me in caring for my patients? Evidence-Based Medicine Working Group. JAMA, 277(22), pp. 1802–1806. Available at: http://jama.ama-assn.org.

Randolph, A.G. et al., 1999. Users’ Guides to the Medical Literature: XVIII. How to Use an Article Evaluating the Clinical Impact of a Computer-Based Clinical Decision Support System. JAMA, 282(1), pp. 67–74. Available at: http://jama.ama-assn.org/cgi/doi/10.1001/jama.282.1.67

Richardson, W.S. & Detsky, A.S., 1995. Users’ guides to the medical literature. VII. How to use a clinical decision analysis. A. Are the results of the study valid? Evidence-Based Medicine Working Group. JAMA, 273(16), pp. 1292–1295. Available at: http://jama.ama-assn.org.

Richardson, W.S. & Detsky, A.S., 1995. Users’ guides to the medical literature. VII. How to use a clinical decision analysis. B. What are the results and will they help me in caring for my patients? Evidence Based Medicine Working Group. JAMA, 273(20), pp. 1610–1613. Available at: http://jama.ama-assn.org.

Richardson, W.S. et al., 1999. Users’ Guides to the Medical Literature: XV. How to Use an Article About Disease Probability for Differential Diagnosis. JAMA, 281(13), pp. 1214–1219. Available at: http://jama.ama-assn.org/cgi/doi/10.1001/jama.281.13.1214

Richardson, W.S. et al., 2000. Users’ Guides to the Medical Literature: XXIV. How to Use an Article on the Clinical Manifestations of Disease. JAMA, 284(7), pp. 869–875. Available at: http://jama.ama-assn.org/cgi/doi/10.1001/jama.284.7.869

Wilson, M.C. et al., 1995. Users’ guides to the Medical Literature. VIII. How to use clinical practice guidelines. B. what are the recommendations and will they help you in caring for your patients? The Evidence-Based Medicine Working Group. JAMA, 274(20), pp. 1630–1632. Available at: http://jama.ama-assn.org.

Books

Dr. Guyatt and Dr. Rennie edited the articles and compiled them to form a book titled Users' Guides to the Medical Literature: A Manual for Evidence-Based Clinical Practice.

The books teach a systematic approach to reading and applying the medical literature to individual patient care.  It focuses on three questions: 1. Whether new information is likely to be valid, 2. What the information says about patient care, and 3. How the information can be used.  To demonstrate the clinical relevance of the suggested approach, each section begins with a practical clinical scenario.  The chapter is then structured around identifying the best available evidence and applying the three key questions to the evidence, in the context of the clinical scenario.  Each chapter concludes with a resolution of the scenario.

Most of the book chapters are based on specific types of clinical questions, including questions of therapy, harm, diagnosis, and prognosis.  Other chapters deal with general skills that are important for all clinical questions, such as “Finding the Evidence”, “Summarizing the Evidence”, and “Moving From Evidence to Action”.

The Users' Guides  come in two book versions: the Essentials introduces the concepts of evidence-based medicine (EBM), with which every practicing clinician should be familiar, while the Manual provides a more comprehensive, in-depth exploration of  EBM concepts for clinicians seeking a deeper understanding, or for those who wish to teach EBM.

Website

The complete text of the second edition of the Users’ Guides Manual is available online by subscription. The JAMAevidence website also includes a large number of calculators, worksheets and additional aids for the practice of EBM, including the updated and edited collection of another long-running JAMA article series, The Rational Clinical Examination: Evidence-based Clinical Diagnosis.

References

External links
 
 

Medical books
American Medical Association
Health informatics
Evidence-based medicine